Zürich Wollishofen railway station is a railway station in the Wollishofen quarter of the Swiss city of Zürich. It is situated close to the western shore of Lake Zurich, and adjacent to the shipyard and pier of the Zürichsee-Schifffahrtsgesellschaft, who operate the principal passenger boat services on the lake.

The station is located on the Lake Zürich left bank line, which originally formed part of the Zürich to Lucerne main line, although most main line trains now use the alternative Zimmerberg Base Tunnel routing since it opened in 2003.

Wollishofen station is within walking distance to the Rote Fabrik, a cultural centre used as a music venue.

Services

Train 
Wollishofen station is served by lines S8 and S24 of the Zürich S-Bahn. 

During weekends, there is a nighttime S-Bahn service (SN8) offered by ZVV:

Tram/Bus/Ship 
There is a tram and bus stop, called Bahnhof Wollishofen, west of the reception building. Another nearby stop is Bhf. Wollishofen/Werft, situated to the east of the station, is a bus stop. Zürich tram route 7 and VBZ bus routes 70, 184 and 185 stop at Bahnhof Wollishofen, while Bhf. Wollishofen/Werft is served by  VBZ bus lines 161 and 165. The pier of Zürichsee-Schifffahrtsgesellschaft (ZSG), Wollishofen ZSG, is located southeast to the railway station.

Summary of tram and bus services:
Bhf.

History 
Because Zug railway station was completely renewed later, the station building was dismantled and rebuilt in Wollishofen in 1897.

Gallery

References

External links 
 
 

Swiss Federal Railways stations
Wollishofen